Alexandre-Jean Dubois-Drahonet, a French portrait painter, was born in Paris in 1791. He also executed a great number of sketches of various national and military costumes, some of which are at Windsor. He died at Versailles in 1834. His portrait of the Duke of Bordeaux is in the Bordeaux Museum.

References

Attribution

 

19th-century French painters
French male painters
French portrait painters
1791 births
1834 deaths
Painters from Paris
19th-century French male artists
18th-century French male artists